The Carlyle Group is a multinational private equity, alternative asset management and financial services corporation  based in the United States with $376 billion of assets under management. It specializes in private equity, real assets, and private credit. It is one of the largest mega-funds in the world. In 2015, Carlyle was the world's largest private equity firm by capital raised over the previous five years, according to the PEI 300 index, though by 2020, it had slipped into second place.

Founded in 1987 in Washington, D.C., by William E. Conway Jr., Stephen L. Norris, David Rubenstein, Daniel A. D'Aniello and Greg Rosenbaum, the company has nearly 1,850 employees in 26 offices on six continents . On May 3, 2012, Carlyle completed a  million initial public offering and began trading on the NASDAQ stock exchange.

History

Founding and early history
Carlyle was founded in 1987 as an investment banking boutique by five partners with backgrounds in finance and government: William E. Conway Jr., Stephen L. Norris, David Rubenstein, Daniel A. D'Aniello and Greg Rosenbaum. The founding partners named the firm after the Carlyle Hotel in New York City (named for Thomas Carlyle) where Norris and Rubenstein had planned the new investment business.  Rubenstein, a Washington-based lawyer, had worked in the Carter Administration.  Norris and D'Aneillo had worked together at Marriott Corporation; Conway was a finance executive at MCI Communications.  Rosenbaum left in the first year and Norris departed in 1995. Rubenstein, Conway and D'Aneillo remain active in the business. Carlyle was founded with $5 million of financial backing from T. Rowe Price, Alex. Brown & Sons, First Interstate Equities, and the Richard King Mellon family.
 
In the late 1980s, Carlyle raised capital deal-by-deal to pursue leveraged buyout investments, including a failed takeover battle for Chi-Chi's.  The firm raised its first dedicated buyout fund with $100 million of investor commitments in 1990.  In its early years, Carlyle also advised in transactions including, in 1991, a $500 million investment in Citigroup by Prince Al-Waleed bin Talal, a member of the Saudi royal family.

Carlyle developed a reputation for acquiring businesses related to the defense industry.  In 1992, Carlyle completed the acquisition of the Electronics division of General Dynamics Corporation, renamed GDE Systems, a producer of military electronics systems.  Carlyle would sell the business to Tracor in October 1994.  Carlyle acquired Magnavox Electronic Systems, the military communications and electronic-warfare systems segment of Magnavox, from Philips Electronics in 1993.  Carlyle sold Magnavox for about $370 million to Hughes Aircraft Company in 1995.  Carlyle also invested in Vought Aircraft through a partnership with Northrop Grumman.  Carlyle's most notable defense industry investment came in October 1997 with its acquisition of United Defense Industries.  The $850 million acquisition of United Defense represented Carlyle's largest investment to that point.  Carlyle completed an IPO of United Defense on the New York Stock Exchange in December 2001, then sold the rest of the stock in April 2004. In more recent years, Carlyle has invested less in the defense industry.

Carlyle in the early 2000s
Carlyle's 2001 investor conference took place on September 11, 2001.  In the weeks following the meeting, it was reported that Shafiq bin Laden, a member of the Bin Laden family, had been the "guest of honor", and that they were investors in Carlyle managed funds.  Later reports confirmed that the Bin Laden family had invested $2 million into Carlyle's $1.3 billion Carlyle Partners II Fund in 1995, making the family relatively small investors with the firm. However, their overall investment might have been considerably larger, with the $2 million committed in 1995 only being an initial contribution that grew over time. These connections would later be profiled in Michael Moore's Fahrenheit 911.  The Bin Laden family liquidated its holdings in Carlyle's funds in October 2001, just after the September 11 attacks, when the connection of their family name to the Carlyle Group's name became impolitic.

Buyouts declined after the collapse of the dot-com bubble in 2000 and 2001. But after the two-stage buyout of Dex Media at the end of 2002 and 2003, large multibillion-dollar U.S. buyouts could once again obtain high-yield debt financing and larger transactions could be completed. Carlyle, together with Welsh, Carson, Anderson & Stowe, led a $7.5 billion buyout of QwestDex, the third-largest corporate buyout since 1989. QwestDex's purchase occurred in two stages: a $2.75 billion acquisition of assets known as Dex Media East in November 2002 and a $4.30 billion acquisition of assets known as Dex Media West in 2003. R. H. Donnelley Corporation acquired Dex Media in 2006. Shortly after Dex Media, other larger buyouts would be completed signaling a resurgence in private equity.

Lou Gerstner, former chairman and CEO of IBM and Nabisco, replaced Frank Carlucci as chairman of Carlyle in January 2003.  Gerstner would serve in that position through October 2008.  The hiring of Gerstner, was intended to reduce the perception of Carlyle as a politically dominated firm.  At the time, Carlyle, which had been founded 15 years earlier had accumulated $13.9 billion of assets under management and had generated annualized returns for investors of 36%.

Carlyle also announced the $1.6 billion acquisition of Hawaiian Telcom from Verizon in May 2004.  Carlyle's investment was immediately challenged when Hawaii regulators delayed the closing of the buyout.  The company also suffered billing and customer-service issues as it had to recreate its back-office systems.  Hawaiian Telcom ultimately filed for bankruptcy in December 2008, costing Carlyle the $425 million it had invested in the company.

As the activity of the large private equity firms increased in the mid-2000s, Carlyle kept pace with such competitors as KKR, Blackstone Group, and TPG Capital.  In 2005, Carlyle, together with Clayton, Dubilier & Rice and Merrill Lynch completed the $15.0 billion leveraged buyout of The Hertz Corporation, the largest car rental agency from Ford.

The following year, in August 2006, Carlyle and its Riverstone Holdings affiliate partnered with Goldman Sachs Capital Partners in the $27.5 billion (including assumed debt) acquisition of Kinder Morgan, one of the largest pipeline operators in the US. The buyout was backed by Richard Kinder, the company's co-founder and a former president of Enron.

In September 2006, Carlyle led a consortium, comprising Blackstone Group, Permira and TPG Capital, in the  $17.6 billion takeover of Freescale Semiconductor.  At the time of its announcement, Freescale would be the largest leveraged buyout of a technology company ever, surpassing the 2005 buyout of SunGard. The buyers were forced to pay an extra $800 million because KKR made a last-minute bid as the original deal was about to be signed. Shortly after the deal closed in late 2006, cell phone sales at Motorola Corp., Freescale's former corporate parent and a major customer, began dropping sharply. In addition, in the recession of 2008–2009, Freescale's chip sales to automakers fell off, and the company came under great financial strain.

Earlier that year, in January 2006, Carlyle together with Blackstone Group, AlpInvest Partners, Hellman & Friedman, KKR and Thomas H. Lee Partners acquired Nielsen Company, the global information and media company formerly known as VNU in an $8.9 billion buyout.  Also in 2006, Carlyle acquired Oriental Trading Company which ultimately declared bankruptcy in August 2010 as well as Forba Dental Management, the owner of Small Smiles Dental Centers, the largest US chain of dental clinics for children.

Carlyle after the global financial crisis
In 2011, Carlyle acquired AlpInvest Partners in a joint venture with the firm's management, entering into a new line of business managing fund of funds, secondary investments and co-investments.  Two years laters, in 2013 Carlyle acquires the remaining ownership stake in AlpInvest after which that business became a wholly-owned subsidiary.

Since 2017
In October 2017, The Carlyle Group announced that its founders would remain executive chairmen on the board of directors but step down as the day-to-day leaders of the firm; they named Glenn Youngkin and Kewsong Lee to succeed them, as co-CEOs, effective January 1, 2018.

On October 2017, The Carlyle Group made a $500 million investment in the brand Supreme valuing the company at $1 billion. In 2020, the investment was acquired by VF Corporation, which owns The North Face, Timberland, and Vans for $2.1 billion.

On October 14, 2019, The Carlyle Group and private equity firm Stellex Capital Management announced it had completed the acquisition and merger of shipbuilder Vigor Industrial LLC, Portland, Ore., and MHI Holdings LLC, a ship repair and maintenance company based in Norfolk, Va. The terms of the deal were not disclosed.

On June 2, 2020, The Carlyle Group and T&D Holdings reported that they had concluded their purchase of a 76.6% stake in Fortitude Group Holdings, the latter of which comprises Fortitude Re, and American International Company Inc. Also in June 2020, Unison had been purchased by the Carlyle Group and Unison management strategic investment company.

In September 2020, The Carlyle Group acquired a majority stake in Minneapolis-based sanitizing machine maker Victory Innovations. Terms of the deal were not disclosed.

At the end of September 2020, Youngkin retired from the firm, stating his intention to focus on community and public service efforts; this left Lee as sole CEO. Youngkin would later go on to be elected Governor of Virginia in the state's 2021 gubernatorial election.

In January 2021, The Carlyle Group acquired a majority stake in Jagex, a UK video game development studio known for the massively multiplayer online game RuneScape.

In March 2022, The Carlyle Group acquired Dainese - an Italian motorcycle kit and clothing company from Investcorp. Following this in May 2022, The Carlyle Group announced the acquisition deal of US government contractor for cyber security and IT defence, ManTech International. The deal worth $3.9 billion, will include the firm to buyout shares at $96 a share, representing a 32% premium to ManTech's closing price on February 2, 2022. The acquisition aimed to increase the firms steady stream of recurring revenue.

In August 2022, The Carlyle Group acquired Abingworth, a transatlantic bioscience investment firm.

In November 2022, it was announced The Carlyle Group has acquired the international marketing agency, Incubeta.

In February 2023, Harvey Schwartz was appointed CEO of the group, replacing Kewsong Lee, who left the position abruptly the previous summer following a power struggle with the co-founders.

Ownership changes
For the first 25 years of its existence, Carlyle operated as a private partnership controlled by its investment partners.  In 2001, the California Public Employees' Retirement System (CalPERS), which had been an investor in Carlyle managed funds since 1996, acquired a 5.5% holding in Carlyle's management company for $175 million.  The investment was valued at about $1 billion by 2007 at the height of the 2000s buyout boom.

In September 2007, Mubadala Development Company, an investment vehicle for the government of Abu Dhabi of the United Arab Emirates, purchased a 7.5% stake for $1.35 billion.

In February 2008, California legislators targeted Carlyle and Mubadala, proposing a bill that would have barred CalPERS from investing money "with private-equity firms that are partly owned by countries with poor records on human rights."  The bill, which was intended to draw attention to the connection between Carlyle and Mubadala Development, was later withdrawn.

In May 2012, Carlyle completed an initial public offering of the company, listing under the symbol CG on the NASDAQ.  The firm, which at the time managed about $147 billion of assets, raised $671 million in the offering.  Following the IPO, Carlyle's three remaining founding partners, Rubenstein, D'Aniello and Conway retained the position as the company's largest shareholders.

In June 2017, Carlyle took its non-traded BDC, TCG BDC, Inc., public in the first business development company IPO since 2014.

Senior leadership 

 Chairman: None (Daniel A. D'Aniello currently serves as chairman emeritus)
 Chief Executive: Harvey Schwartz

List of chairmen 

 Frank Carlucci (1992–2003)
 Lou Gerstner (2003–2008)
 Daniel A. D'Aniello (2012–2018)

List of former chief executives 

 William E. Conway Jr. and David M. Rubenstein (1987–2017)
 Kewsong Lee and Glenn Youngkin (2017–2020)
 Kewsong Lee (2020–2022)

Business segments 
The firm is organized into three business segments:
 Global Private Equity – Management of Carlyle's family of private equity funds investing primarily in leveraged buyout and growth capital transactions through a range of geographically focused investment funds.  This segment also includes management of funds that pursue investments in real estate, infrastructure and energy and renewable resources.
 Global Credit – Management of funds that pursue investments in distressed & special situations, direct lending, energy credit, loans & structured credit and opportunistic credit; and
 Global Investment Solutions – Management of funds that invest in private equity and real estate fund of funds, co-investment and secondaries through its AlpInvest Partners subsidiary.

Corporate Private Equity 
Carlyle's Corporate Private Equity division manages a series of leveraged buyout and growth capital investment funds with specific geographic or industry focuses.  Carlyle invests primarily in the following industries: aerospace, defense & government services, consumer & retail, energy, financial services, health care, industrial, real estate, technology and business services, telecommunications & media, and transportation.

Carlyle's Corporate Private Equity segment advises 23 buyout and 10 growth capital funds, with $75 billion in Assets Under Management ("AUM") as of March 31, 2018.

Real Assets 
Carlyle's Real Assets segment advises 11 U.S. and internationally  focused real estate funds, two infrastructure funds, two power funds, an international energy fund, and four Legacy Energy funds (funds that Carlyle jointly advises with Riverstone). The segment also includes nine funds advised by NGP. The Real Assets segment had about $44 billion in AUM as of March 31, 2018.

Global Credit 
Carlyle's Global Credit segment advises 53 funds that pursue investment opportunities across distressed and special situations, direct lending, energy credit, loans and structured credit and opportunistic credit. The Global Credit segment had about $34 billion in AUM as of March 31, 2018.

Investment Solutions 

Carlyle's Investment Solutions segment advises global private equity through its subsidiary, AlpInvest Partners.  Alpnvest manages fund of funds programs and related Co-investments and Secondary investments across more than 340 fund vehicles. The Investment Solutions segment has approximately $63 billion of assets under management as of December 31, 2022.

AlpInvest Partners is one of the largest private equity investment managers globally with over  $63 billion under management as of December 31, 2022, invested alongside more than 325 private equity firms.  Founded in 2000, AlpInvest had historically been the exclusive manager of private equity investments for the investment managers of two of the world's largest pension funds Stichting Pensioenfonds ABP (ABP) and Stichting Pensioenfonds Zorg en Welzijn (PFZW), both based in the Netherlands. In 2011, Carlyle acquired AlpInvest and has integrated the business, including its leading fund-of-funds and secondary platforms, significantly expanding Carlyle's global asset management business.  Since its acquisition in 2011, AlpInvest has grown its investor base from its two original Dutch pension sponsors to more than 450 institutional investors globally.

AlpInvest pursues investment opportunities across the entire spectrum of private equity including: large buyout, middle-market buyout, venture capital, growth capital, mezzanine, distressed and sustainable energy investments. New York, Amsterdam, London, Hong Kong, San Francisco, Indianapolis, Singapore and Tokyo with over 100 investment professionals and over 175 employees.

Carlyle had previously acquired a real estate fund of funds group, Metropolitan Real Estate, to provide investors with access to multi-manager real estate funds and strategies with more than 85 fund managers in the United States, Europe, Asia and Latin America. Metropolitan was sold in 2021 to BentallGreenOak.

Subsidiaries and joint-ventures
Carlyle has been actively expanding its investment activities and assets under management through a series of acquisitions and joint-ventures.

Carlyle Capital Corporation
In March 2008, Carlyle Capital Corporation – established in August 2006 for the purpose of making investments in U.S. mortgage-backed securities – defaulted on about $16.6 billion of debt as the global credit crunch brought about by the subprime mortgage crisis worsened for leveraged investors. The Guernsey-based affiliate of Carlyle was very heavily leveraged, up to 32 times by some accounts, and it expected its creditors to seize its remaining assets. Tremors in the mortgage markets induced several of Carlyle's 13 lenders to make margin calls or to declare Carlyle in default on its loans. In response to the forced liquidation of mortgage-backed assets caused by the Carlyle margin calls and other similar developments in credit markets, on March 11, 2008, the Federal Reserve gave Wall Street's primary dealers the right to post mortgaged-back securities as collateral for loans of up to $200 billion in higher-grade, U.S. government-backed securities.

On March 12, 2008, BBC News Online reported that "instead of underpinning the mortgage-backed securities market, it seems to have had the opposite effect, giving lenders an opportunity to dump the risky asset" and that Carlyle Capital Corp. "will collapse if, as expected, its lenders seize its remaining assets." On March 16, 2008, Carlyle Capital announced that its Class A Shareholders had voted unanimously in favor of the Corporation filing a petition  under Part XVI, Sec. 96, of the Companies Law (1994) of Guernsey for a "compulsory winding up proceeding" to permit all its remaining assets to be liquidated by a court-appointed liquidator.

The losses to the Carlyle Group due to the collapse of Carlyle Capital are reported to be "minimal from a financial standpoint".

In September 2017, the court ruled that Carlyle had no liability in the lawsuit.

In documentaries
Carlyle has been profiled in Michael Moore's Fahrenheit 9/11 and William Karel's The World According to Bush.

In Fahrenheit 9/11, Moore makes nine allegations concerning the Carlyle Group.  Moore focused on Carlyle's connections with George H. W. Bush and his Secretary of State James Baker, both of whom had at times served as advisers to the firm. The movie quotes author Dan Briody, who claimed that the Carlyle Group "gained" from the September 11 attacks because it owned military contractor United Defense.  A Carlyle spokesman noted in 2003 that its 7% interest in defense industries was far less than several other private equity firms.

In The World According to Bush, William Karel interviewed Frank Carlucci to discuss the presence of Shafiq bin Laden, Osama bin Laden's estranged brother, at Carlyle's annual investor conference while the September 11 attacks were occurring.

See also
The Carlyle Group companies (category)
Arbusto Energy

References

External links

 The Carlyle Group (company website)
 Mubadala Development Company
 Carlyle Group - Mergr Profile

1987 establishments in Washington, D.C.
2012 initial public offerings
 
Financial services companies established in 1987
Companies listed on the Nasdaq
Financial services companies based in Washington, D.C.
Mezzanine capital investment firms
Private equity firms based in Washington, D.C.
American companies established in 1987